Gnathocolumna is a genus of moths belonging to the subfamily Tortricinae of the family Tortricidae. It consists of only one species, Gnathocolumna asymmetra, which is found in Peru.

The wingspan is about 19 mm. The ground colour of the forewings is cream brown, but paler posteriorly. The suffusions, strigulae and venation in the posterior half of the wing are brownish and the markings are greyish brown. The hindwings are dirty cream with grey-brown strigulation.

Etymology
The specific name refers to the asymmetry of the terminal plate of the gnathos.

See also
List of Tortricidae genera

References

Euliini